Pssst! Doggie- is a 1971 children's picture book by American author and illustrator Ezra Jack Keats.

In this almost wordless book, a cat asks a dog to dance. Suddenly we are carried away on a flight of imagination, from country to country and from era to era, by the humorous antics of the unusual pair on the dance floor.

1973 children's books
American picture books
Books by Ezra Jack Keats
Dogs in literature
Books about cats